Alexander McDonald (c. 1745 – 21 December 1821) was a Royal Marine who came to Australia in the First Fleet. In 1792 he was granted land in present-day Ermington by Governor Arthur Phillip, thus making him among the first land owners in the colony.

References

External links
Family Tree and some history
 http://localhistory.kingston.vic.gov.au/htm/article/499.htm

1740s births
1821 deaths
Royal Marines officers
History of New South Wales